The displaced persons camp of Eschwege, a former German air force base in the Frankfurt district of the American-occupied zone, became a displaced persons (DP) camp in January 1946.

The camp housed approximately 1,770 Jews at the time of its opening and its young population quickly developed a revitalized community, evidenced by the opening of a kindergarten with 50 children by April 1947. In contrast, the elementary school had only 30 students at that time. It also had a Talmud Torah, a cheder, and a yeshiva, as well as a "Bet Ya'akov" religious high school for girls. 

Religious life was also celebrated in the camp's several synagogues and a mikvah. It had a sports club with 100 players, a movie theater, a 500-seat auditorium, and a theater group. The camp published the newspaper Undzer Hofenung (Our Hope).

At its peak, on October 19, 1946, the camp housed roughly 3,355 Jews. It closed on April 26, 1949.

Notes
This article incorporates text from the United States Holocaust Memorial Museum, and has been released under the GFDL.

External links
United States Holocaust Memorial Museum - Eschwege

Displaced persons camps in the aftermath of World War II
History of Frankfurt